Gregory Olin Cook (December 8, 1958 – March 19, 2005) was an American basketball player. Nicknamed "Cookieman", he played collegiately for the LSU Tigers and was renowned for his defensive prowess.

Cook posted his best statistics during his freshman season in 1976–77 when he averaged 11.5 points and 9.2 rebounds. He sat out the 1977–78 season before returning for his three final seasons. During those years, Cook helped lead the Tigers to an SEC tournament championship in 1980 and an NCAA Final Four appearance in 1981. He was selected by the New York Knicks as the 40th overall pick in the 1981 NBA draft but never played in the league. Cook played briefly in the Continental Basketball Association (CBA), appearing in five games for the Wyoming Wildcatters in the 1984–85 season.

Cook died in his sleep in Houston, Texas, aged 46.

Career statistics

College

|-
| style="text-align:left;"| 1976–77
| style="text-align:left;"| LSU
| 27 || 27 || 30.1 || .462 || – || .589 || 9.2 || 1.9 || – || – || 11.5
|-
| style="text-align:left;"| 1978–79
| style="text-align:left;"| LSU
| 28 || – || – || .465 || – || .617 || 6.3 || 2.1 || – || – || 6.3
|-
| style="text-align:left;"| 1979–80
| style="text-align:left;"| LSU
| 31 || – || 29.1 || .400 || – || .659 || 5.8 || 2.7 || 1.1 || .2 || 4.4
|-
| style="text-align:left;"| 1980–81
| style="text-align:left;"| LSU
| 33 || 26 || 28.6 || .564 || – || .710 || 5.3 || 1.6 || 1.0 || .1 || 9.2
|- class="sortbottom"
| style="text-align:center;" colspan="2"| Career
| 119 || 53 || 29.2 || .480 || – || .646 || 6.6 || 2.1 || 1.0 || .1 || 7.8

References

External links
College statistics

1958 births
2005 deaths
Abraham Clark High School alumni
African-American basketball players
American men's basketball players
Basketball players from Newark, New Jersey
Centers (basketball)
LSU Tigers basketball players
New York Knicks draft picks
People from Roselle, New Jersey
Power forwards (basketball)
Sportspeople from Union County, New Jersey
Wyoming Wildcatters players
20th-century African-American sportspeople
21st-century African-American people